Ikariotikos or Kariotikos (sometimes written with an apostrophe as 'Καριώτικος) is a traditional dance and accompanying song originating in Ikaria a Greek island in the North Eastern Aegean Sea. Some specialists say that the traditional Ikariotikos was slow and the quick "version" of it, is a Ballos. The name Kariotikos is mostly used by the locals of Ikaria.

Is first danced with the arms in the basket weave hold then as the dance speeds up it is danced by the hand hold on the shoulders. There are three parts to the dance, In the first part of the dance we have slow moving walking steps (similar to a Sta Tria), while the second, part we move into a dance similar in steps to the Issios of Kalymnos and then in the third part we move into the quick steps with the mobility of both legs and body.

The most famous song that accompanies the Ikariotikos dance is called "My love of Ikaria", lyrics and music are by Giorgos Konitopoulos. Music and dancing are major forms of entertainment in Ikaria. Throughout the year Ikarians host baptisms, weddings, parties and religious festivals where one can listen and dance to live traditional Ikarian music.

See also
Ballos
Greek dances
Greek folk music
Greek music
Kalamatianos
Syrtos

External links
The score and lyrics of Ikariotikos(Dostou dostou)
Yannis Parios-Hronia kai hronia
Ikarian Youth Information Forums Photos on Ikaria
Video of Ikariotikos as danced in Ikaria in 2015

Greek dances
Icaria